Svajūnas Ambrazas (born 20 February 1967) is a Lithuanian orienteering competitor.

He received a silver medal at the World Games in 2005 in the mixed relay, with Vilma Rudzenskaitė, Edgaras Voveris and Giedrė Voverienė, when the Lithuanian team finished second behind Norway.

His finished 14th in the short distance and 12th in the classic distance at the World Orienteering Championships in 1995. In 1999 he participated on the Lithuanian relay team that finished 6th. He was also a member of the Lithuanian relay team in the 2005 world championships, when they finished 6th.

References

External links
 

1967 births
Living people
Lithuanian orienteers
Male orienteers
Foot orienteers
World Games medalists in orienteering
World Games silver medalists
Competitors at the 2001 World Games